Lulu Press, Inc., doing business under trade name Lulu, is an online print-on-demand, self-publishing, and distribution platform. By 2014, it had issued approximately two million titles.

The company's founder is Red Hat co-founder Bob Young. Lulu's current CEO is Kathy Hensgen. The company's headquarters are in Morrisville, North Carolina.

Products
Lulu produces books in print and digital form. Printed books are available in several formats and sizes including paperback, coil bound, and hardcover. Books can be printed in black and white or in full color.

In 2009, Lulu began publishing and distributing ebooks. Lulu also prints and publishes calendars and photo books. In 2017, Lulu introduced an Open Access print-on-demand service.[Citation needed]

Process
Authors upload their book as a PDF file to Lulu using their book creation process. Material is submitted in digital form for publication. Authors can then buy copies of their own book and/or make it available for purchase in the Lulu Bookstore. 

Applying an ISBN and meeting distribution requirements makes books eligible for distribution to online retail outlets such as Amazon.com, Barnes & Noble, and Apple's iBookstore.

The author of a title receives an 80% royalty for print books and a 90% royalty for eBooks when sold. Copyright of works uploaded and distributed via Lulu remains with the author.

Replay Photos
In January 2014, Lulu announced that it had acquired Durham (NC)-based sports photography company Replay Photos. Replay Photos sells licensed images of collegiate and professional sports teams as photographic prints, custom framed photos, photos on canvas, and original wall art.

Digital Rights Management (DRM)
Lulu's final phase for their Digital Rights Management (DRM) Retirement project was released July 2, 2013. Prior to January 15, 2013, a Lulu author could choose to apply Digital Rights Management (DRM) protection to their PDF or EPUB.

Lulu Jr.
In 2014, Lulu launched Lulu Jr., which enables children to become published authors.
Lulu Jr. products include My Comic Book and IlluStory.

Lulu Blooker Prize

The Lulu Blooker Prize was a literary award for "blooks" (books based on blogs). It was awarded in 2006 and 2007 and sponsored by Lulu. An overall prize was awarded, based on the winners of three subsidiary categories: non-fiction, fiction, and comics. The Lulu Blooker Prize was open to any "blook" that had been published "to date" (i.e., by the entry deadline) by any publisher.[Citation needed]

2006
The first competition saw 89 entries from over a dozen countries. A panel of three judges decided the winners: Cory Doctorow, Chair of Judges; Paul Jones; and Robin "Roblimo" Miller.

Winners
 Julie and Julia: 365 Days, 524 Recipes, 1 Tiny Apartment Kitchen by Julie Powell (main prize, non-fiction)
 Four and Twenty Blackbirds by Cherie Priest (fiction)
 Totally Boned: A Joe and Monkey Collection by Zach Miller (comics, self-published through Lulu)

Runners-up
 Biodiesel Power by Lyle Estill (runner up, non-fiction, see biodiesel)
 Hackoff.com: An Historic Murder Mystery Set in the Internet Bubble and Rubble by Tom Evslin (runner up, fiction)
 Dinosaur Comics: Huge Eyes, Beaks, Intelligence, and Ambition by Ryan North (runner up, comics)

2007
The 2007 competition had 110 entries from 15 countries. The number of judges was increased to five: Paul Jones (chair), Arianna Huffington, Julie Powell (2006 overall winner), Rohit Gupta, and Nick Cohen.

Winners
 My War: Killing Time in Iraq by Colby Buzzell (Overall Winner and Non-Fiction Winner)
 The Doorbells of Florence by Andrew Losowsky (Fiction Winner)
 Mom's Cancer by Brian Fies (Comics Winner)

Runners-up
 My Secret: A PostSecret Book by Frank Warren (Non-Fiction)
 Island: A Zombie Novel by David Wellington (Fiction)

See also 

 Smashwords

References

External links
 

2002 establishments in North Carolina
American companies established in 2002
Publishing companies established in 2002
Publishing companies of the United States
Digital press
Self-publishing online stores
Online bookstores
Self-publishing companies
Book publishing companies based in North Carolina
Privately held companies based in North Carolina